The 1973–74 Cypriot Second Division was the 19th season of the Cypriot second-level football league. ASIL Lysi won their 2nd title.

Format
Fourteen teams participated in the 1973–74 Cypriot Second Division. All teams played against each other twice, once at their home and once away. The team with the most points at the end of the season crowned champions. The first team was promoted to 1974–75 Cypriot First Division. The last  team was relegated to the Cypriot Third Division.

Changes from previous season
Teams promoted to 1973–74 Cypriot First Division
 APOP Paphos FC

Teams relegated from 1972–73 Cypriot First Division
 ASIL Lysi

Teams promoted from 1972–73 Cypriot Third Division
 Neos Aionas Trikomou

Teams relegated to 1973–74 Cypriot Third Division
 AEK Ammochostos

League standings

See also
 Cypriot Second Division
 1973–74 Cypriot First Division
 1973–74 Cypriot Cup

References

Cypriot Second Division seasons
Cyprus
1973–74 in Cypriot football